Paraphrosylus is a genus of flies in the family Dolichopodidae.

Species
Paraphrosylus californicus (Harmston, 1952)
Paraphrosylus direptor (Wheeler, 1897)
Paraphrosylus grassator (Wheeler, 1897)
Paraphrosylus nigripennis (Van Duzee, 1924)
Paraphrosylus praedator (Wheeler, 1897)
Paraphrosylus wirthi (Harmston, 1951)

References

Hydrophorinae
Dolichopodidae genera
Taxa named by Theodor Becker
Diptera of North America